The Brisbane Rhinos are a gridiron football club competing in the Gridiron Queensland league. The club is situated in Mitchelton in the Northern Suburbs of Brisbane, Queensland.

History

Player Pathway
In recent years the Brisbane Rhinos have been focusing on players development and providing our players with the opportunities to play abroad and in US colleges. 2019 & 2020 were our most successful years securing 3 full ride scholarships for u19 players in US colleges.

Rhinos Players Whove Received Scholarships
Jordan Moko (Texas A&M)
Jack Loew (Kent State)
Jack Low (Fordham University)
Tom Hanson (Washburn University)

Rhinos Players Player in US College
Eddie Kocwa
Tim Reynolds 
Duane Tuatasi (San Jose State Spartans)

Early Seasons
The Brisbane Rhinos were founded by four dedicated players who decided a gridiron team was needed on Brisbane's northside. The Brisbane Rhinos American Football Club was established in 2001, and after a few seasons made the playoffs in 2004 losing to eventual champions the Ipswich Cougars in the playoffs. The following season the Rhinos beat the Cougars in the semi final on a last minute play to make their first Sunbowl. They went on to defeat the Daisy Hill Wildcats 12-7 to be crowned the champions. 2006 saw the Rhinos again make the Sunbowl but were beaten by the Gold Coast Stingrays 27-13. 2008 proved to be a good season for the Rhinos becoming minor premieres and also making another appearance in the Sunbowl, unfortunately again going down to the Gold Coast Stingrays.

A number of the Brisbane Rhinos American Football Club players have gained selection on the state and national gridiron teams. Including 8 players in the Queensland state squad for the 2010 Nationals. These players were Brad Boland, Geno Gerbo, Luke Jackson, Kris Hodge, Paul Mason, John Mellifont, Matt Neil and Graham Spurr.

The Rhinos also have a team competing in the junior division (14-18 yrs) since 2003 and made the Sunbowl in that division in 2004, losing to the Bayside Ravens after winning a triple overtime semi final. Also in 2008 losing to the Gold Coast Stingrays.

2005 Season / Queensland Sun Bowl XXI
The Brisbane Rhinos won the E-Banc Trade Gridiron Queensland Sun Bowl XXI 12-7 over the Daisy Hill Wildcats on Saturday 12 November 2005, held at Usher Park, Daisy Hill.

The game was a classic hard hitting football game with the Fullbacks and Running Backs on both teams earning every yard the hard way.

The Rhinos clearly dominated the 1st quarter, with the offense putting a string of plays together culminating in a touchdown. Unfortunately the offense were unable to convert the touchdown. The 2nd quarter while dominated by the Rhinos, the offense was unable to score.

The second half started the way the Rhinos knew it would, with the Wildcats giving the ball to their Fullback or Running Back on every play, trying to run it down the throat of the league's best defense. Showing that great defenses will bend but never break, the Wildcats did manage a touchdown late in the 3rd quarter but that was them done for the game. The Rhinos defense seemed to be fired up and hell bent on showing that another touchdown was not going to happen again for the rest of the game. The 3rd quarter was forgettable for the Rhinos offense but they did keep their heads up and came back in the 4th quarter proving that the game isn't over till the final whistle.

In the fourth quarter the Rhinos offense started like the 3rd, with not much happening. Then with a little over 2 min remaining in the game the Rhinos offense took over after the Rhinos defense shut down the Wildcats running game. The Rhinos came out fired up and ready to prove that they can never be underestimated. The Offense spluttered at first but then picked up the pace and started to move the ball down the field. With 1.22mins remaining in the game the Rhinos were 4th down and 9 yards to a first down and 20+ yards needed for a touchdown. The Rhinos offense dug deep and were out to prove the coaches confidence in them was justified. The Wildcats seemed to already be celebrating a win, but the Rhinos weren't done yet!

With a clean snap to QB Dan Clark, the Rhinos offensive line used their bulk and training to create a good pocket. With wide receivers Callum O'Sullivan & Matt Neil heading towards the end zone it was going to be all or nothing. O'Sullivan ran a perfect post route and crossed the goal line just in front of the goal posts, quarterback Dan Clark saw this unfolding and delivered a perfect hard & fast pass right into the arms of Callum. It was such an accurate pass that the two Wildcat defenders covering O'Sullivan had no chance of batting the pass down.

The Rhinos originally kicked the conversion but were flagged for 12 men on the field. The penalty meant the Rhinos had to try the conversion from the 20yd line. Unfortunately kicker Mark Tatnell had the leg but not the accuracy. Score 12-7 with 44 seconds remaining.

The Wildcats had to abandon their running game which they had used all game, to try and score as quickly as possible. But the cornerbacks were at their best and ready for anything the Wildcats threw at them. After several pass attempts and a few flags against the Rhinos, the Wildcats still needed to make 60yds for a touchdown. Unable to do so the Rhinos had achieved what the rest of the league had thought was impossible.. winning a Sunbowl and becoming Queensland Sunbowl XXI Champions!

Team awards

MVP
2020 Chiam James
2019 Brandon Gwinner
2018 Christian Strong
2017 Chiam James
2016 
2015 
2014 
2013 
2012 
2011 Luke Jackson
2010 Mark Fleming
2009 Luke Jackson
2008 Luke Jackson
2007 Nicolai Hanson
2006 Dan Clark
2005 Paul Mason
2004 Paul Mason
2003 Ewan Macleod
2002 Shawn Maloney
2001 Doug Coyle

Rhinos Players that have been selected for Queensland and Australia
2015 World Cup Team

Eddie Kocwa

2011 World Cup Team

Luke Jackson
Paul Mason

2010 Senior State Team

Paul Mason - Captain
Luke Jackson
John Mellifont
Brad Boland
Geno Gerbo

2015 Under 19 Australian Team

Jo Rasmussen

2010 Under 19 Australian Team

Cameron McDougall

2009 Junior State Team

Cameron McDougall
Devon Kitts
Scott Lehmann

2009 Senior Australian Team

Paul Mason

2009 Under 19 Australian Team

Ben Stower

2008 Senior State Team

Paul Mason
Luke Jackson
John Mellifont

2006 Senior State Team

Paul Mason
Matt Neil
Callum O'Sullivan

2005 Senior State Team

Gerardo Cardenas
Luis Cardenas
Aaron Couder
Shane Dun
Daniel Franklin
Matt Gundry
Michael Jenkinson
Dave Kirby
Bou Leiua
Paul Mason
Matt Neil
Ben Rudes- Captain

2003 Senior State Team

Shawn Maloney
Paul Mason

See also

Gridiron Australia

References

External links
https://www.facebook.com/Brisbanerhinos?fref=ts

American football teams in Queensland
Sporting clubs in Brisbane
American football teams established in 2000
2000 establishments in Australia